The Bulolo Valley is a geographical area in Bulolo District, Morobe Province, Papua New Guinea. The Bulolo River and its tributaries form the extent of the valley before it meets with the Markham Valley.

History
Gold mining and forestry form the main industries in the valley.

References

Valleys of Papua New Guinea
Morobe Province